Mahmudiyeh (also Romanized as Maḩmūdīyeh; also known as Mahmū’īyeh) is a village in Negar Rural District, in the Central District of Bardsir County, Kerman Province, Iran. At the 2006 census, its population was 8, in 6 families.

References 

Populated places in Bardsir County